Nowy Dzień (Polish for "New Day") was a short-lived Polish middle-market daily newspaper, which appeared from 14 November 2005 until 23 February 2006. Nowy Dzień was launched by the publishing company Agora SA, after its flagship publication Gazeta Wyborcza had come under increasing pressure from Fakt, a low-cost tabloid introduced by Axel Springer Polska in 2003.

Nowy Dzień was conceived as a "quality tabloid" with entertaining, but at the same time more serious journalism than that of typical tabloids such as Fakt's German "parent" product, Bild-Zeitung. The paper's editorial staff consisted mainly of detached Gazeta Wyborcza employees. The publisher envisaged an average circulation of 250,000 copies, but it remained continuously below that and had a downward trend. By early 2006, circulation had dropped from an initial level of 212,000 to about 130,000 copies. As a result, Agora S.A. decided to discontinue the paper. Since then, Gazeta Wyborcza has had to continue its increasingly difficult effort to appeal to both upmarket and middle-market readerships.

2005 establishments in Poland
2006 disestablishments in Poland
Defunct newspapers published in Poland
Newspapers published in Warsaw
Daily newspapers published in Poland
Polish-language newspapers
Publications established in 2005
Publications disestablished in 2006